The Theatre Royal at Gloucester, at which Charles Dickens once performed, was an important theatre in the history of the city.

The theatre was built in 1791 by John Boles Watson in upper Westgate Street. Watson died in 1813, and the theatre was sold to the businessman John Blinkhorn in 1857. Charles Dickens once performed the trial scene from The Pickwick Papers to a capacity audience. At its centenary in 1891, Sir Henry Irving and Ellen Terry both appeared with members of the Lyceum Company. In 1902 the theatre was sold again to Charles Poole who changed it to a variety theatre and picture house. Myriorama shows were given. The theatre closed in the early 1920s and was replaced by Woolworths in 1922. The site is currently a discount store.

The Theatre Vaults public house was located nearby.

References

Further reading
Denning, Anthony. (1993) Theatre in the Cotswolds: The Boles Watson Family and the Cirencester Theatre. London: Society for Theatre Research. 

Buildings and structures in Gloucester
1791 establishments in England
Theatres completed in 1791
Theatres in Gloucestershire
History of Gloucester